Teddy Moore Nesbitt (born 6 September 1993) is a semi-professional footballer who plays for Isthmian League club Canvey Island.

Career
Nesbitt came through Southend United's youth system, making his professional debut on 26 March 2011, in their 2–1 away loss to Stockport County in League Two. He came on as substitute for another debutant, James Stevens at half-time. Southend manager, Paul Sturrock praised Nesbitt saying; "Teddy was excellent when he came on in the second half. He got himself stuck in there and he got himself forward, but he's got a lot to learn." On 18 May 2012, Nesbitt was one of eleven players to be released at the end of their contract.

References

External links
Southend United profile

Living people
English footballers
Southend United F.C. players
Concord Rangers F.C. players
Great Wakering Rovers F.C. players
Thurrock F.C. players
Aveley F.C. players
VCD Athletic F.C. players
Billericay Town F.C. players
East Thurrock United F.C. players
English Football League players
National League (English football) players
Isthmian League players
1993 births
Association football defenders